Fedustria is the Belgian non profit federation of the textile, wood and furniture industry. It was founded on 20 December 2006 in Ghent and is the successor of Febeltex and Febelhout. The organization represents a turnover of 12 billion Euro employs more than 60,000 people in 2,700 companies in Belgium. Fedustria is also the parent organization of the  Belgian Flax and Linen Association.

Textile companies
 To be expanded
 Associated Weavers
 Beaulieu International Group
 DOMO Group
 Libeco
 Seyntex
 Sioen Industries

Wood and furniture companies
 To be expanded

See also
 Agoria
 Federation of Belgian Enterprises
 Future Textiles and Clothing (EU)

Sources
 Febeltex en Febelhout fuseren tot Fedustria (Dutch)
 Febeltex en Febelhout fuseren tot Fedustria (Dutch)

External links
 Fedustria

Trade associations based in Belgium